Carmines is a surname. Notable people with the surname include:

Al Carmines (1936–2005), American theatre composer
Edward Carmines (born 1946), American political scientist

See also
Carmine (disambiguation)